The 2015–17 William & Mary Tribe women's basketball team represented The College of William & Mary during the 2016–17 NCAA Division I women's basketball season. The Tribe, led by fourth year head coach Ed Swanson, played their home games at Kaplan Arena and were members of the Colonial Athletic Association (CAA). They finished the season 20–11, 9–9 in CAA play to finish in fifth place, although they were seeded fourth in the CAA women's tournament. They advanced to the quarterfinals of the CAA tournament, losing there to Elon. Despite having 20 wins, they were not invited to a postseason tournament.

Roster

Schedule

|-
!colspan=9 style=""| Non-conference regular season

|-
!colspan=9 style=""| CAA regular season

|-
!colspan=9 style=""|

See also
 2016–17 William & Mary Tribe men's basketball team

Footnotes

References

William & Mary Tribe women's basketball seasons
William And Mary
William
William